I'll Close My Eyes is an album by guitarist Doug Raney recorded in 1982 and released on the Danish label, SteepleChase.

Track listing 
 "I'll Close My Eyes" (Billy Reid, Buddy Kaye) – 9:40
 "Billy's Bossa" (Horace Parlan) – 9:37
 "You've Changed" (Victor Young) – 7:58
 "Bolivia" (Cedar Walton) – 7:03
 "Pullin' Through" (Ole Mathisen) – 6:54 Bonus track on CD reissue

Personnel 
Doug Raney – guitar
Bernt Rosengren – tenor saxophone, alto flute
Horace Parlan – piano
Jesper Lundgaard – bass
Ole Jacob Hansen – drums

References 

Doug Raney albums
1982 albums
SteepleChase Records albums